Sorting nexin family member 27, also known as SNX27, is a human gene.

This gene encodes a member of the sorting nexin family, a diverse group of cytoplasmic and membrane-associated proteins involved in endocytosis of plasma membrane receptors and protein trafficking through these compartments. All members of this protein family contain a phosphoinositide binding domain (PX domain). A highly similar protein in mice is responsible for the specific recruitment of an isoform of the serotonin 5-hydroxytryptamine 4 receptor into early endosomes, suggesting the analogous role for the human protein.

References

Further reading